The Africa Cup of Nations is a football competition established in 1957. It is contested by the men's national teams of members of the Confederation of African Football (CAF), the African governing body for the sport, and is held every four years. The winner of the first final was Egypt, who defeated Ethiopia 4–0 in Khartoum, after extra time. The last final hosted in Yaoundé in 2022 was won by Senegal, which beat Egypt 4–2 on penalties.

The Africa Cup of Nations final is the last match of the competition, and the result determines which team will be declared African champion. As of the 2021 edition, if the score is tied after 90 minutes of regular play, an additional 30-minute period of play, called overtime, is added. If such a match remains tied after extra time, it is decided by a penalty shootout. The team that wins the penalty shootout is then declared the champion.

The 33 finals to-date have produced seven drawn matches, the eventual winners of which have been determined variously by replay (1974), extra time (1962, 1965), penalty shoot-out (1982, 1986, 1992, 2000, 2002, 2006, 2012, 2015, 2021).Egypt is the most successful teams in the history of the tournament, winning seven times.

List of finals

Notes

Results by nation 
Years shown in bold indicate that the country also hosted that tournament. 

1 as United Arab Republic
2 as Congo-Kinshasa
3 as Zaire

References

External links
 African Nations Cup at the RSSSF

Africa Cup of Nations finals
Africa Cup of Nations